Marie Kaipu (born 16 August 1997) is a Papua New Guinean footballer who plays as a midfielder for POM FC and the Papua New Guinea women's national team.

Notes

References

1997 births
Living people
Women's association football midfielders
Papua New Guinean women's footballers
Papua New Guinea women's international footballers